Mvila is a department of South Province in Cameroon. The department covers an area of 8697 km and as of 2005 had a total population of 179,429. The capital of the department lies at Ebolowa.

Subdivisions
The department is divided administratively into 8 communes and in turn into villages.

Communes 
 Biwong-Bane
 Biwong-Bulu
 Ebolowa (urban)
 Ebolowa (rural)
 Efoulan
 Mengong
 Mvangane
 Ngoulemakong

References

Departments of Cameroon
South Region (Cameroon)